The Waco 9 is an American-built three-seat biplane design that first flew in 1925.

Development
The Waco 9 was the first of the steel-tubed fuselage aircraft designs to be built by the Advance Aircraft Company, which became the Waco Aircraft Company circa 1929. The Model 9 was a three-seat open cockpit biplane with the ailerons on the upper wings extending outboard of the main wing surfaces.

About 270 Model 9 aircraft were built during 1925 and 1926.

Operational history
The Model 9 was of rugged construction to meet the barnstorming requirements of the period. The cost when new was between $2,025 and $2,500. A Waco 9 was flown in the 1926 Ford National Reliability Air Tour.

The Model 9 was the first aircraft type to be fitted with aluminum floats (by the EDO Corporation in 1928). By 2007, a few examples remained airworthy in the US and five aircraft were held by museums.

Variants
Model 9s were fitted with a variety of engines including the  Curtiss OX-5, the  Curtiss OXX-6,  Curtiss C-6 and the  Hisso A. Fitment of the various engines did not change the model number.

Aircraft on display
A Waco 9, C116, "Miss McKeesport" is a part of the Ohio History Connection permanent collection. The airplane is currently on loan to the WACO Air Museum in Troy, Ohio. The airplane was constructed in 1927 and restored in 1985. It still retains its original Curtiss OX-5 engine.

A Waco 9, C218, is on display at the Western Antique Aeroplane & Automobile Museum located in Hood River, Oregon. It is displayed in the Pacific Air Transport Air Mail livery.

Specifications (Model 9 with Curtiss OX-5 engine)

References
Notes

Bibliography

 Ogden, Bob. Aviation Museums and Collections of North America. Tonbridge, Kent, UK: Air-Britain (Historians) Ltd., 2007. .

External links

 Details of Waco aircraft production at aerofiles.com

1920s United States civil utility aircraft
9
Biplanes
Single-engined tractor aircraft
Aircraft first flown in 1925